Anstruther Wester in Fife was a royal burgh, created in 1587, that returned one commissioner to the Parliament of Scotland and to the Convention of Estates.

After the Acts of Union 1707, Anstruther Wester, Anstruther Easter, Crail, Kilrenny and Pittenweem formed the Anstruther Easter district of burghs, returning one member between them to the House of Commons of Great Britain.

List of burgh commissioners

 1661: Thomas Watson, councillor 
 1665 convention: Peter Oliphant the younger, bailie 
 1672–1690 not eligible as a non-Royal Burgh
 1689 convention, 1689–1701: Robert Clelland 
 1702–07: Sir Robert Anstruther of Wrae and Balcaskie

References

See also
 List of constituencies in the Parliament of Scotland at the time of the Union

Constituencies of the Parliament of Scotland (to 1707)
Politics of Fife
History of Fife
Constituencies disestablished in 1707
1707 disestablishments in Scotland
Anstruther